Roundaboutness, or roundabout methods of production, is the process whereby capital goods are produced first and then, with the help of the capital goods, the desired consumer goods are produced.

An argument against Böhm-Bawerk's theory of roundaboutness, in economies with compound interest, was presented by Paul Samuelson during the Cambridge capital controversy.

The concept, interpreted as rising technical composition of capital, is also used by some Marxian authors.

References

Austrian School